Arvid Benjamin Smit (born 12 December 1980 in Heerhugowaard, North Holland) is a Dutch football coach and former professional footballer who played as a midfielder. He is currently the assistant coach for the Netherlands women's national football team.

Football career
After impressing with Telstar in the second division, Smit was signed by country giants PSV Eindhoven in 2002, but would appear very rarely officially for his new team and never in the Eredivisie, going on to serve three loans in the country, always in the top flight.

In January 2007, still owned by PSV, Smit moved to Portugal's C.S. Marítimo, making his first appearance on the 29th in the local derby of Madeira against C.D. Nacional. After a good spell – he started in all the Primeira Liga games during the season, completing all but one – the move was made permanent, but he was deemed surplus to requirements shortly after, which prompted a new January move, also in the country, as he joined (on loan) U.D. Leiria.

Smit returned to his country in the 2008 summer, signing with top level side FC Volendam. After having appeared sparingly throughout the campaign, he dropped down a category and returned to his first professional club, Telstar, retiring from professional football in July 2011 at the age of 30.

References

External links
Beijen profile 
Stats at Voetbal International 

1980 births
Living people
People from Heerhugowaard
Dutch footballers
Association football midfielders
Eredivisie players
Eerste Divisie players
SC Telstar players
De Graafschap players
PSV Eindhoven players
FC Groningen players
Willem II (football club) players
FC Volendam players
Primeira Liga players
Segunda Divisão players
C.S. Marítimo players
U.D. Leiria players
Dutch expatriate footballers
Expatriate footballers in Portugal
Dutch expatriate sportspeople in Portugal
Footballers from North Holland